Arnold William Haarlow Jr. (May 5, 1913 – November 21, 2003) was an American basketball player who played in the American National Basketball League.

Haarlow was a star player in high school, playing for Bowen High in Chicago. He then attended the University of Chicago from 1933 to 1936 at a time when the school was a member of what is now the Big Ten Conference.  Haarlow was one of the top scorers in the conference throughout his college career, leading the league in scoring as a junior.

Following his college career, Haarlow played for the Whiting Ciesar All-Americans in the National Basketball League (a precursor to the National Basketball Association).  Haarlow averaged 6.6 points per game for the 1937–1938 season.

After his playing days, Haarlow became a basketball referee for the Big Ten Conference, eventually serving as director of conference officials for 17 years.  He died on November 21, 2003.

References

External links
NBL stats

1913 births
2003 deaths
All-American college men's basketball players
American men's basketball players
Basketball players from Chicago
Chicago Maroons men's basketball players
Forwards (basketball)
Whiting Ciesar All-Americans players